Mohan Das was an Indian politician belonging to Asom Gana Parishad. He was elected as a member of Assam Legislative Assembly from Patacharkuchi in 1996. He died on 5 July 2019.

References

2019 deaths
Assam MLAs 1996–2001
Asom Gana Parishad politicians
Year of birth missing